The Shire of Woocoo was a local government area located in the Wide Bay–Burnett region of Queensland, Australia, containing the rural residential area to the west of the town of Maryborough, and surrounding countryside.

Industry in the shire consisted of beef cattle, sugar, timber and light industry servicing Maryborough.

History
Woocoo was proclaimed a shire under the Local Authorities Act 1902 on 4 December 1914, with its centre of administration at Brooweena. It had previously been part of the Shire of Tiaro, and also included parts of the Shires of Antigua and Howard. The shire was named for Mount Woocoo, which itself was probably named for the local Aboriginal word for "echidna". It held its first meeting on 30 January 1915.

In 1922, the residents of the Woocoo Shire erected a war memorial outside St Mary's Church of England on the Maryborough-Biggenden Road in Teebar (now within Boompa). The Woocoo Shire War Memorial was unveiled on Saturday 6 January 1923 by Major-General Thomas William Glasgow. In 1992 the memorial was relocated to the Woocoo Historical Museum in Brooweena due to concerns about vandalism and is now known as the Brooweena War Memorial.

On 27 March 1976, the Shire of Woocoo grew by  when the Shire of Burrum was renamed Shire of Hervey Bay and recast as a local government area centred on the Hervey Bay urban area. At this time, Woocoo was resubdivided into three divisions each electing two councillors.

On 15 March 2008, under the Local Government (Reform Implementation) Act 2007 passed by the Parliament of Queensland on 10 August 2007, Woocoo merged with the City of Hervey Bay, City of Maryborough and part of Tiaro to form the Fraser Coast Region.

Towns and localities
The Shire of Woocoo included the following settlements:

 Antigua
 Aramara
 Bidwill
 Boompa
 Brooweena
 Dunmora
 Grahams Creek
 Mungar
 Oakhurst
 Owanyilla
 Tinana South
 Woocoo
 Yengarie

Population

  The population for the 1976 boundaries was 2,938.
  The 1991 census population of the revised Woocoo area was 2,562.

Chairmen and mayors

 1915-1916:  George Smyth Mant 
 1917: Laurence Stevens Smith 
 1918: J. Bourke 
 1919-1926:  George Smyth Mant 
 1927-1929:  W C Mathison [Maryborough Chronicle received from State Library of Queensland ref. ASK65230 rec'd 11/07/2019]
 1930-1935:  George Smyth Mant [information in the Maryborough Chronicle received from State Library of Queensland ref. ASK65230 rec'd 11/07/2019]
 1936-1948:  J C "Cliff" Irons [information in the Maryborough Chronicle received from State Library of Queensland ref. ASK65230 rec'd 11/07/2019]
 1949-1955:  Charles Ronald Sutton "Ron" Smith [information in the Maryborough Chronicle received from State Library of Queensland (also personal family history -  my uncle)]

1955-1959: ????

1960:      L.L. "Len" Harvey

1961-1973:  Charles Ronald Sutton "Ron" Smith [article in the Maryborough Chronicle early 1973 (also personal family history - my uncle)]

1973-1988: ????

1988–1992: David Braddock

1992-2000: ????

2000–2007: Kevin Mahoney

2007: Iain Lewis (Acting)

2007–2008: Gloria Banting

References

Former local government areas of Queensland
Populated places established in 1914
2008 disestablishments in Australia
Populated places disestablished in 2008